Loramie Township is one of the fourteen townships of Shelby County, Ohio, United States.  The 2000 census found 2,438 people in the township, 1,887 of whom lived in the unincorporated portions of the township.

Geography
Located in the southwestern corner of the county, it borders the following townships:
Cynthian Township – north
Washington Township – east
Washington Township, Miami County – southeast
Newberry Township, Miami County – south
Wayne Township, Darke County – west
Patterson Township, Darke County – northwest corner

The village of Russia is located in western Loramie Township, and the unincorporated communities of Houston and Mount Jefferson lie in the northern and northeastern parts of the township.

Name and history
Loramie Township was established in 1825, and named after a pioneer merchant. It is the only Loramie Township statewide.

Government
The township is governed by a three-member board of trustees, who are elected in November of odd-numbered years to a four-year term beginning on the following January 1. Two are elected in the year after the presidential election and one is elected in the year before it. There is also an elected township fiscal officer, who serves a four-year term beginning on April 1 of the year after the election, which is held in November of the year before the presidential election. Vacancies in the fiscal officership or on the board of trustees are filled by the remaining trustees.

References

External links
County website

Townships in Shelby County, Ohio
Populated places established in 1825
1825 establishments in Ohio
Townships in Ohio